Mimacronia regale is a species of beetle in the family Cerambycidae. It was described by Barševskis in 2015. It is known from the Philippines.

References

Pteropliini
Beetles described in 2015